REScoop Vlaanderen is the energy cooperative for renewable energy in Flanders, Belgium.

It was created in 2011 on the initiative of the Flemish energy cooperative Ecopower. 
REScoop Vlaanderen is a member of the European group of cooperatives for renewable energy, REScoop.eu.

RESCoop stands for Renewable Energy Sources Cooperatives. 
A co-operative (also known as co-op, cooperative or coop) is an autonomous association of persons united voluntary to meet their common economic, social, and cultural needs and aspirations through a jointly owned and democratically controlled business.

The following energy cooperatives are member of RESCoop Vlaanderen: 
 Ecopower 
 BeauVent 
 Wase Wind
 PajoPower
 Energiris
 CORE
 Social Green Energy
 Campina Energy
 Bronsgroen

References

Energy companies of Belgium
Energy cooperatives
Renewable energy companies of Europe
Renewable energy in Belgium
Energy companies established in 2011
Renewable resource companies established in 2011
Belgian companies established in 2011